Bruce Smith (born 8 October 1946) is a New Zealand cricketer. He played in 42 first-class and 13 List A matches for Wellington from 1965 to 1977.

See also
 List of Wellington representative cricketers

References

External links
 

1946 births
Living people
New Zealand cricketers
Wellington cricketers
Cricketers from Wellington City